The Girl of the Golden West is a surviving 1915 American Western silent black-and-white film directed by Cecil B. DeMille. It was based on the 1905 play The Girl of the Golden West by David Belasco. Prints of the film survive in the Library of Congress film archive. It was the first of four film adaptations that have been made of the play.

Plot
A hard-bitten saloon girl falls for a dashing outlaw, and tries to keep the local sheriff from catching him and sending him to prison.

Cast

 Mabel Van Buren as The Girl
 Theodore Roberts as Jack Rance
 House Peters Sr. as Ramerrez
 Anita King as Wowkle
 Sydney Deane as Sidney Duck
 William Elmer as Ashby (credited as Billy Elmer)
 Jeanie MacPherson as Nina (credited as Jeane McPherson)
 Raymond Hatton as Castro
 Richard L'Estrange as Senor Slim (credited as Dick Le Strange)
 Tex Driscoll as Nick, The Bartender
 Artie Ortego as Antonio (credited as Arthur Ortego)
 John Oretgo as Stagecoach Driver
 James Griswold as Guard
 Edwin Harley as Old Minstrel

Preservation status
Prints survive at George Eastman Museum, the Library of Congress,  (Gemona), Academy Film Archive (Beverly Hills).

References

External links
 
 
 
 
 

1915 films
1915 Western (genre) films
American black-and-white films
American films based on plays
Films directed by Cecil B. DeMille
Silent American Western (genre) films
1910s American films
1910s English-language films